Laura Fry (13 January 1967 – 26 September 2012) was a British equestrian. She competed in two events at the 1992 Summer Olympics. She died from breast cancer, aged 45.

Her daughter, Charlotte Fry, is also an equestrian, and won Bronze in the Team Dressage at the 2020 Tokyo Olympics.

References

External links
 

1967 births
2012 deaths
British female equestrians
Olympic equestrians of Great Britain
Equestrians at the 1992 Summer Olympics
People from Totnes